Sverre Krogh may refer to:

 Sverre Krogh (editor) (1883–1957), Norwegian actuary, newspaper editor and politician for the Labour and Communist Labour parties
 Sverre Krogh (politician) (1921–2006), Norwegian farmer, organizational leader and politician for the Centre Party